Elections were held in the Australian state of Queensland on 19 May  1956 to elect the 75 members of the state's Legislative Assembly. The Labor government was seeking its ninth continuous term in office since the 1932 election; it would be Vince Gair's second election as Premier.

Labor would not win another election in the state until 1989.

Key dates

Results

|}

 775,258 electors were enrolled to vote at the election, but 6 seats representing 62,750 enrolled voters were unopposed: three Country seats (28,062 voters), two Liberal seats (23,119 voters) and one Labor seat (11,569 voters).

Seats changing party representation

This table lists changes in party representation at the 1956 election.

Aftermath
This was to be Labor's last successful election until the 1989 election. On 18 April 1957, the Queensland Central Executive of the Labor Party passed a vote of no confidence in Premier Gair, and on 24 April, despite having gained a unanimous vote of support from the Cabinet, he was expelled from the Labor Party. On 26 April, Gair convened a meeting of 25 MLAs, including all of the Cabinet except Deputy Premier John Duggan and two ex-Labor Independents, and formed the Queensland Labor Party (QLP) with those present, while the Labor Party moved to the opposition benches. All these were also expelled from the party. The resulting government was denied supply in parliament, and an election was called for 3 August, at which the QLP government and the Labor Party were defeated by the Country-Liberal coalition led by Frank Nicklin.

See also
 Members of the Queensland Legislative Assembly, 1953–1956
 Members of the Queensland Legislative Assembly, 1956–1957
 Candidates of the Queensland state election, 1956
 Gair Ministry

References

Elections in Queensland
1956 elections in Australia
1950s in Queensland
May 1956 events in Australia